Fredric William Taylor was a British physicist and academic. He was Halley Professor of Physics Emeritus at the University of Oxford, where he lived until his death in December 2021.

Early life and education
Taylor was born in Amble, Northumberland, England. His father, William, was a joiner who had been wounded in World War II, and his mother, Ena, was a teacher. In 1949, the family moved to Howick, Northumberland. He was educated at The Duke's School, then an all-boys school in Alnwick. He studied physics at the University of Liverpool, graduating with a first class Bachelor of Science (BSc) degree. He then undertook postgraduate research in atmospheric physics at Jesus College, Oxford under the supervision of Sir John Houghton, and graduated from the University of Oxford with a Doctor of Philosophy (DPhil) degree.

Academic career
In 1970, Taylor joined the Jet Propulsion Laboratory of the California Institute of Technology. He was principal investigator for the first experiment into the meteorology of the atmosphere of Venus, building an instrument for the Pioneer Venus Orbiter that launched in 1978. Arriving at Venus in December 1978, this included the first British-built hardware to travel to another planet.  He was also involved in the mission that sent the unmanned spacecraft Galileo to study Jupiter and its moons.

In 1980, he returned to Oxford University where he became Professor and Head of Department. Under his leadership, the Group was involved in space missions to study the atmospheres of Earth, Venus, Mars, Jupiter, Saturn and Titan, as well as Mercury, the Moon, and a comet.  In 1999, one of the Oxford projects placed the first British-built hardware on the surface of Mars, albeit unwittingly.

Taylor was the author of twelve books on atmospheric and planetary physics. In September 2011, he retired from full-time academia and from the Halley Professorship of Physics. He died on 16 December 2021.

Selected works
Academic
 
 
 
 
 
 
 
 

Personal

References

Living people
British physicists
Statutory Professors of the University of Oxford
Year of birth missing (living people)
People from Amble
Alumni of the University of Liverpool
Alumni of Jesus College, Oxford
People from Howick, Northumberland